Scott Cleverdon (born 31 July 1969) is a Scottish actor best known as the angel Pyriel in the film The Prophecy 3: The Ascent. He has also done significant voice acting.

He was born and brought up in Edinburgh, attending Broughton High School, Edinburgh and trained in Glasgow's Royal Scottish Academy of Music and Drama. In 1994, he provided the voice for Cletus Cassidy, AKA "Carnage" in Spider-Man: The Animated Series. In 2008, Cleverdon starred in the film Ecstasy based on The Undefeated from Irvine Welsh's best-selling novel Ecstasy: Three Tales of Chemical Romance.

From 2011, he played Gonzalo Fernández de Córdoba in the TV series, Borgia, which also starred his wife, actress Assumpta Serna, whom he met in 1993 while filming Sharpe.

Personal life
He married the Spanish actress Assumpta Serna in 1993. They live in Los Angeles and Europe, and jointly run an acting workshop.

Filmography

Movie

Television

Video games

Ecstasy (2007)
Dear Green Place (2006) – Vigo Masterson
Wedding Belles (2007) – Kevin
Tortilla Heaven (2007) – Jesus
Goya's Ghosts (2006) – French General
The Amazing Grace (2006) – Oliver
Soldier of God (2005) – Geoffrey
55 Degrees North (2005) – Cory North
Murphy's Law (2005) – Daniel McGeechan
Rebus: The Hanging Garden (2000) – "Pretty Boy" Summers
Soccer Dog: European Cup (2004) – Alex Foote
Kill the Man (1999) – Revolutionary No. 3
Royal Standard (1999) – Loki
Secret Service Guy (1999) – Victor Fresco
Germans (1998) – Willi Sonnenbruch
McHale's Navy (1997) – David
Beverly Hills, 90210 (1997) – Neil Phillips
The Sentinel (1996) – Connor
Kiss & Tell (1996) – Scott DeBirdy
Baywatch Nights (1995) – Photographer 
Sharpe's Company (1994) – Lt. Harry Price
Taggart (1993) – Jeremy Napier
Soldier Soldier (1992) – 2nd Lt Nesbitt
No Job for a Lady (1992) – Craig
Agatha Christie's Poirot – (1991) – President

References

External links

1969 births
Living people
Male actors from Edinburgh
Scottish male film actors
Scottish male television actors
Scottish male video game actors
Scottish male voice actors
Scottish people of English descent
20th-century Scottish male actors
21st-century Scottish male actors